Ákos Kovács may refer to:

 Ákos Kovács (radiologist) (1903–1980), Hungarian radiologist
 Ákos Kovács (singer) (born 1968), Hungarian singer